"Good Times" is a song released in 2005 by American musician Tommy Lee. It is the second single released from his second solo album Tommyland: The Ride. The song is also the theme song for the reality TV series Tommy Lee Goes to College.

The song is Lee's most successful as a solo artist.

"Good Times" reached number ninety-five on the Billboard Hot 100 and reached number twenty-five in Australia.

Lee performed the song live at the Comedy Central Roast of ex-wife Pamela Anderson.

Charts

References

2005 singles
Songs written by Tommy Lee
Songs written by Scott Humphrey
Songs written by Butch Walker
2005 songs